Wicimice  is a village in the administrative district of Gmina Płoty, within Gryfice County, West Pomeranian Voivodeship, in north-western Poland.

See also
History of Pomerania

Notable residents
 Erich Hoffmann (1868–1959), dermatologist
 Hans-Georg von der Osten (1895-1987), Luftwaffe officer
 Christoph Friedrich von der Osten (1714–1777), German nobleman (Landrat des Osten- und Blücherschen Kreises)
 Leopold von der Osten (1788–1853), prussian generalmajor
 Eduard von der Osten (1804–1887), prussiean generalmajor
 August von der Osten (1855–1895), German nobleman and politician (Landrat des Kreises Regenwalde)

References

Wicimice